Roshagadu is a 1983 Telugu film directed by K.S.R. Das. The film stars Chiranjeevi and Madhavi.

Synopsis
Chiranjeevi played a dual role - Sikindar and Srikanth. Sikindar is a big and rowdy criminal who used to steal diamonds, cash and property from smugglers and dump them in a secret place (Durga temple). One day the smugglers attack Sikindar. In the ensuing chase Sikindar meets with an accident, after he gave a diary to a seemingly simple beggar. The diary recorded the details of Sikindar's hoard.

Srikanth has a sister and sister-in-law, Madhavi. He loves his sister and his mother, and on his death bed gives instructions to raise his sister. Madhavi's father does not agree to give his daughter to Srikanth for marriage, since he is very poor. After the death of Sikindar, Srikanth comes to town and is caught by the smugglers since they suspect that he is actually Sikindar. They torture him along with Silk Smitha who is an undercover police officer attempting to dislodge the smugglers. Because of this, Silk Smitha believed that Srikanth is not Sikindar and both escape. Kannada Prabhakar is a major villain and catches him with his sister. Later they kill Srikanth's sister and Srikanth escapes and prepares to get revenge on all smugglers including Prabhakar.

Cast

Soundtrack 

The soundtrack was composed by Sathyam. All lyrics were written by Rajasri.

Reception 
The film was remade in Hindi as Dav Pech with Jeetendra.

References

External links

1983 films
1980s Telugu-language films
Films directed by K. S. R. Das
Films scored by Satyam (composer)
Films with screenplays by the Paruchuri brothers
Telugu films remade in other languages